ABCD rating, also called the Jewett staging system or the Whitmore-Jewett staging system, is a staging system for prostate cancer that uses the letters A, B, C, and D.

 “A” and “B” refer to cancer that is confined to the prostate.
 “C” refers to cancer that has grown out of the prostate but has not spread to lymph nodes or other places in the body.
 “D” refers to cancer that has spread to lymph nodes or to other places in the body.

References
 ABCD rating in NCI Dictionary from PDQ (2004).  Verified availability 2005-03-25.

Cancer staging
Urology